Billy Burke or similar names may refer to:

Billie Burke (1884–1970), American stage and screen actress
Billy Burke (actor) (born 1966), American actor
Billy Burke (criminal) or William "Billy the Kid" Burke *1858–1919), American gangster
Billy Burke (evangelist) (born 1953), Pentecostal faith healer
Billy Burke (firefighter) (1955–2001), sacrificed his life when the World Trade Centers collapsed 
Bill Burke (photographer) (born 1943), American documentary photographer

Athletes
Bill Burke (athlete) (born 1969), American middle-distance runner
Billy Burke (baseball) (1889–1967), Major League Baseball player
Billy Burke (golfer) (1902–1972), professional golfer
Billy Burke (hurler) (1912–1995), Irish hurler
Willie Burke (born 1972), Irish footballer

Fictional characters
Billy Burke, a character played by Treat Williams in The Devil's Own
Billy Burke, a character in the Irish novel series Zom-B

See also
William Burke (disambiguation)